Kathrine Virginia Switzer (born January 5, 1947) is an American marathon runner, author, and television commentator.

In 1967, she became the first woman to run the Boston Marathon as an officially registered competitor. During her run, race manager Jock Semple assaulted Switzer, trying to grab her bib number and thereby remove her from official competition. After knocking down Switzer's trainer and fellow runner Arnie Briggs when he tried to protect her, Semple was shoved to the ground by Switzer's boyfriend, Thomas Miller, who was running with her, and she completed the race.

The AAU banned women from competing in races against men as a result of her run, and it was not until 1972 that the Boston Marathon established an official women's race.

Life and career
Switzer was born in Amberg, Germany, the daughter of a major in the United States Army. Her family returned to the United States in 1949. She graduated from George C. Marshall High School in Fairfax County, Virginia, then attended Lynchburg College. She transferred to Syracuse University in 1967, where she studied journalism and English literature. She earned a bachelor's degree there in 1968 and a master's degree in 1972.

1967 Training
After transferring from Lynchburg to Syracuse, Switzer sought permission to train with the men's cross-country running program.  Permission was granted, and cross-country assistant coach Arnie Briggs began training with her.  Briggs insisted a marathon was too far for a "fragile woman" to run, but he conceded to Switzer: "If any woman could do it, you could, but you would have to prove it to me. If you ran the distance in practice, I’d be the first to take you to Boston." By the winter of 1967, Switzer was training for the upcoming Boston Marathon, tackling courses in Syracuse and on the roads between Syracuse and Cazenovia, New York, 20 miles away.

1967 Boston Marathon
Technically, the rule book for the Boston Marathon made no mention of gender.  But it was widely understood that women were prohibited from running in official competition: the rules of the AAU, which governed the Marathon, declared that women could not compete in AAU-sanctioned races over a mile and a half.  

This exclusion of women from a premier athletic event was already drawing high-profile challenges.  In 1966, Bobbi Gibb had tried to enter the race officially and had been rejected by BAA Director Will Cloney with the explanation that women were physiologically incapable of running 26 miles.  Gibb ran the full 1966 race anyway, jumping unobserved onto the course near the starting pen in the middle of the pack.  She finished with a time of 3:21:40, ahead of two-thirds of the runners.  But Gibb wore no runner's bib and was not an official entrant.  

Kathrine Switzer had decided that she would run as an official competitor despite the prohibitions.  She registered using her assigned AAU number, and paid the full race fee.  The required certificate of fitness and the application signature she provided were both submitted under the name 'K.V. Switzer.'  Switzer later said she signed the application "as I always sign my name." She also stated that her name had been misspelled on her birth certificate, so she often used her initials to avoid confusion.  She had a male runner collect her bib - number 261 - before the race.

Switzer's father was supportive of his daughter's entry into the race, and on race day, other runners assembling for the start greeted her with support and enthusiasm, leading her to feel "very welcome". She ran among others from her running club, including coach Arnie Briggs and her boyfriend Tom Miller.

As Gibb had the year earlier, Switzer wore a hooded sweatshirt to cover her long hair and avoid attention, but a few miles into the course, the hood slipped off and it became clear that a woman was running the Boston Marathon as an official entrant.

At this point, John "Jock" Semple jumped off the following press truck and charged after Switzer. Semple was one of the Marathon's indispensable characters, an irascible Scots-born former runner who was described in Sports Illustrated as "Mr. Boston Marathon himself."  Semple had been volunteering to manage the race for decades, and had kept the event afloat during years when press and runners alike lost interest in the marathon.  He did much of the actual organizing of the race, processed most of the applications, and wrangled the mob of runners to the start of the course on race day.  He was also a strict traditionalist who considered the Marathon to be "sacred," and was well known in Marathon circles for his custom of charging angrily after participants he found insufficiently serious about the race.  In the mid-1960s he chased a contestant running in an Uncle Sam outfit, repeatedly dashing cups of water in the runner's face.  In 1957, he reportedly was almost charged with attempted assault after he threw himself bodily at a racer running in webbed snorkeler's shoes and a grotesque mask.  To Semple, women competing in defiance of the rules were as out of line as the costume-wearing pranksters he decried as "weirdies."

Semple charged at Switzer and tried to rip her numbered bib off of her running clothes, to prevent her from continuing as an official competitor. In her memoir, she wrote:

Semple succeeded in removing one of Switzer's gloves, but did not remove her bib.  When Switzer's coach Arnie Briggs attempted to protect Switzer, Semple knocked him out of the way.  Soon after, Switzer's boyfriend, Tom Miller, a 235-pound ex-football player and nationally ranked hammer thrower who was running with her, threw his shoulder into Semple and knocked him to the ground.  Semple complained in a 1968 interview about Miller's success in stopping his assault, saying, "That guy's a hammer thrower, for cripes' sake!" 

Switzer finished the marathon in approximately 4 hours and 20 minutes.  Semple's attack was captured by photographers and the melee on the course made international headlines.  The symbolism of Switzer's escape from Semple's charge far overshadowed the success of Bobbi Gibb, who ran the race for the second time and was the first woman to cross the 1967 finish line, with a time almost an hour faster than Switzer's.  As she had in 1966, Gibb ran without a bib.  She was not challenged during the race.

Semple later claimed that Switzer had been issued a number through an "oversight" in the entry screening process.

Boston Athletic Association director Will Cloney—who had rejected Bobbi Gibb's entry into the 1966 Boston Marathon—was asked his opinion of Switzer competing in the race. Although the race rule book made no mention of gender and Switzer had a valid race registration, Cloney said: "Women can't run in the Marathon because the rules forbid it. Unless we have rules, society will be in chaos. I don't make the rules, but I try to carry them out. We have no space in the Marathon for any unauthorized person, even a man. If that girl were my daughter, I would spank her."

Because Switzer had successfully slipped through the entry restrictions, the AAU formally barred women from all competitions with male runners, with violators losing the right to compete in any race. Switzer, with other female runners, tried to convince the Boston Athletic Association to allow women to participate in the marathon. Finally, in 1972, the Boston Marathon established an official women's race.

According to Switzer, she understood the gravity of her participation and accomplishment:

Later, Switzer would soften her views on Semple.  The two became friends, and Switzer wrote:

Later competition, work, and honors

Switzer was the women's winner of the 1974 New York City Marathon, with a time of 3:07:29 (59th overall). Her personal best time is 2:51:37, at Boston in 1975.

Switzer was named Female Runner of the Decade (1967–77) by Runner's World Magazine. She later became a television commentator for marathons, starting with the 1984 Olympic women's marathon, and received an Emmy Award for her work. In 1979, the Supersisters trading card set was produced and distributed; one of the cards featured Switzer's name and picture.

Switzer wrote Running and Walking for Women over 40 in 1997. She released her memoir, Marathon Woman, in April 2007, on the 40th anniversary of her first running of the Boston Marathon. In April 2008, Marathon Woman won the Billie Award for journalism for its portrayal of women in sports.

Switzer has said that when she attends the Boston Marathon, she is glad to see other female runners:

She was inducted into the National Women's Hall of Fame in 2011 for creating a social revolution by empowering women around the world through running. Since 1967, she has worked to improve running opportunities for women.

In 2015, Switzer launched a global non-profit called 261 Fearless with an ambassador program, club training system, and events. 261 Fearless uses running as a means to empower women to overcome life obstacles and embrace healthy living.

For the 2017 Boston Marathon—her ninth time running the race, and the 50th anniversary of her first time—she was assigned bib number 261, the same number she had been assigned in 1967. She was placed in wave 1 and corral 1 and finished in 4:44:31. She was leading a team of runners from 261 Fearless, and rather than being the only woman officially in the race like in 1967, she was joined by over 13,700 women—almost half of the total runners. That same year, the Boston Athletic Association announced it would not assign bib number 261 to any future runners, as an honor for Switzer.

Also in 2017, she ran the New York City Marathon for the first time since 1974; she finished in 4:48:21.

In May 2018, Switzer was the commencement speaker at the 164th commencement of Syracuse University, and received an honorary doctorate of humane letters degree.

Personal life
In 1968, Switzer married Tom Miller, the man who had put an end to Semple's attack in 1967. They divorced in 1973. Switzer subsequently married and divorced public relations executive Philip Schaub. She married British-born New Zealand runner and author Roger Robinson in 1987.

Switzer eventually made amends with Semple after he changed his mind with regard to women in sports. The two became close friends, and she last visited him shortly before Semple's death in 1988.

Achievements

References

External links

 
 Kathrine Switzer Non Profit Organisation 261 Fearless
 Bettman Archives image of Semple and Switzer at the 1973 Boston Marathon
 Marathon Women - Morning Edition, NPR (April 15, 2002)
 Interview with "ATHLETE" (film) director David Lam
 Kathrine Switzer Documentary produced by Makers: Women Who Make America
 Chapter of her book
 Excerpt from Runner's World

1947 births
Living people
American female long-distance runners
Boston Marathon
New York City Marathon female winners
Sports Emmy Award winners
American feminists
21st-century American women